The list of ship launches in 1870 includes a chronological list of some ships launched in 1870.


References 

Sources

1870
Ship launches